Crepidomanes intricatum, synonym Trichomanes intricatum, is known as the weft fern. The genus Crepidomanes is accepted in the Pteridophyte Phylogeny Group classification of 2016 (PPG I), but not by some other sources. , Plants of the World Online sank the genus into a broadly defined Trichomanes, treating this species as Trichomanes intricatum.

This is an unusual filmy fern that grows in rock shelters and crevices in the eastern United States, being known only from its gametophyte generation. It is a rare plant that is protected in several US states.

Recent study has found a relationship between this species and an Asian filmy-fern species, Crepidomanes schmidianum. Both share the same chloroplast genome. The relationship is uncertain. In 2011, Atsushi Ebihara and Alan S. Weakley transferred Trichomanes intricatum to Crepidomanes intricatum based on the chloroplast molecular sequence data.

References

Hymenophyllales
Ferns of the United States
Flora of the Northeastern United States
Flora of the Southeastern United States
Flora without expected TNC conservation status